Gamelan gong gede, meaning "gamelan with the large gongs", is a form of the ceremonial gamelan music of Bali, dating from the court society of the fifteenth and sixteenth centuries, associated historically with public ceremonies and special occasions such as temple festivals.

Style 

Usually performed by a temple orchestra of over forty musicians, music written for the gong gede is sedate and graceful, following an andante tempo. It fluctuates in cycles, one fast, one slow, one loud, and one soft. The beat is provided by the largest gong.

Popularity 

During their colonization of Bali in the late nineteenth century, the Dutch dissolved the courts. The use of the gong gede became limited to temple music. It was later superseded in popularity by gong kebyar, a more up-tempo form of gamelan played with smaller gongs, that originated in Balinese villages in the late 19th century and became widely popular in the 1920s and 1930s.

See also 

 Gamelan
 Gong kebyar
 Joged bumbung
 Salendro 
 Gamelan semar pegulingan

References

Citations

External links 
Examples of recordings of gamelan gong gede:
 Gamelan Gong Gede of Batur Temple
 Bali: Musique pour le Gong Gede

Music of Bali
Gamelan ensembles and genres